Randall Drew Denton (born February 18, 1949) is an American former professional basketball player.

Denton graduated from William G. Enloe High School in 1967. A 6'10" center from Duke University, Randy holds the all-time Duke record for average rebounds per game at 12.7. Denton played six seasons (1971–1977) in the American Basketball Association and National Basketball Association as a member of the Carolina Cougars, Memphis Pros / Tams, Utah Stars, Spirits of St. Louis, and Atlanta Hawks. He averaged 11.5 points and 8.6 rebounds in his ABA/NBA career.

References

External links 
 

1949 births
Living people
American expatriate basketball people in Italy
American men's basketball players
Atlanta Hawks players
Basketball players from Raleigh, North Carolina
Boston Celtics draft picks
Centers (basketball)
Duke Blue Devils men's basketball players
Carolina Cougars players
Memphis Pros players
Memphis Sounds draft picks
Memphis Tams players
Spirits of St. Louis players
Utah Stars players
William G. Enloe High School alumni